Andreas Bienz (born 16 June 1960) is a Swiss sailor. He competed in the Star event at the 1992 Summer Olympics.

References

External links
 

1960 births
Living people
Swiss male sailors (sport)
Olympic sailors of Switzerland
Sailors at the 1992 Summer Olympics – Star
Place of birth missing (living people)